The two-domain system is a biological classification by which all organisms in the tree of life are classified into two big domains, Bacteria and Archaea. It emerged from development in the knowledge of archaea diversity and challenge over the widely accepted three-domain system that defines life into Bacteria, Archaea, and Eukarya. It was predicted by the eocyte hypothesis of James A. Lake in the 1980s, which was largely superseded by the three-domain system due to better compelling evidences at the time. Better understanding of archaea, especially in their roles in the origin of eukaryotes by symbiogenesis with bacteria, led to the revival of the eocyte hypothesis in the 2000s. The two-domain system became widely appreciated after the discovery of a large group (superphylum) of archaea called Asgard in 2017, evidences of which suggest to be the evolutionary root of eukaryotes – implying that eukaryotes are members of the domain Archaea.

While the features of Asgard archaea do not directly rule out the three-domain system, the notion that eukaryotes originated from archaea and thus belong to Archaea has been strengthened by genetic and proteomic studies. Under the three-domain system, Eukarya is mainly distinguished by the presence of "eukaryotic signature proteins" that are not found in archaea and bacteria. However, Asgards are found to contain genes that codes for several of such unique proteins, indicating that the proteins originated in archaea.

Background 
Classification of life into two main divisions is not new and the first was by a French biologist Édouard Chatton. In 1938, Chatton gave a broad distinction of organisms:

 Procaryotes (that include bacteria)
 Eucaryotes (that include protozoans)

These were later named empires, and Chatton's classification as the two-empire system. Chatton used the name Eucaryotes only for protozoans, excluded other eukaryotes, and published in limited circulation so that his work was not recognised. His classification was rediscovered by Canadian bacteriologist Roger Yates Stanier of the University of California in Berkeley in 1961 while staying at the Pasteur Institute in Paris. The next year, Stanier and his colleague Cornelis Bernardus van Niel published in Archiv für Mikrobiologie (now Archives of Microbiology) Chatton's classification with Eucaryotes eloborated to include higher algae, protozoans, fungi, plants and animals. It became a popular system of classification, as John O. Corliss wrote in 1986: "[The] Chatton-Stanier concept of a kingdom (better, superkingdom) Prokaryota for bacteria (in the broadest sense) and a second superkingdom Eukaryota for all other organisms has been widely accepted with enthusiasm."

In 1977, Carl Woese and George E. Fox classified prokaryotes into two groups (kingdoms), Archaebacteria (for methanogens, the first known archaea) and Eubacteria, based on their 16S ribosomal RNA (16S rRNA) genes. In 1984, James A. Lake, Michael W. Clark, Eric Henderson, and Melanie Oakes of the University of California, Los Angeles described what was known as "a group of sulfur-dependent bacteria" as new group of organisms called eocytes (for "dawn cells") and created a new kingdom Eocyta. With it they proposed the existence of four kingdoms, based on the structure and composition of the ribosomal subunits, namely Archaebacteria, Eubacteria, Eukaryote and Eocyta  Lake further analyses the rRNA sequences of the four groups and noted that eukaryotes originated from eocytes and not archaebacteria, as was generally assumed. This was the basis of the eocyte hypothesis. In 1988, he proposed the division of all life forms into two taxonomic groups:

 Karyotes (that include eukaryotes and proto-eukaryotic organisms such as eocytes)
 Parkaryotes (that consist of eubacteria and archaea such as halobacteria and methanogens)

In 1990, Woese, Otto Kandler and Mark Wheelis showed that archaea are distinct group of organisms and that eocytes (which was renamed Crenarchaeota as a phylum of Archaea but corrected as Thermoproteota in 2021) are one of them. They introduced the major division of life as domains and introduced the three-domain system that comprises domain Eucarya, domain Bacteria and domain Archaea. With a number of revisions in the details and discoveries of several new archaea, Woese's classification gradually gained acceptance as "arguably the best-developed and most widely-accepted scientific hypotheses [with the five-kingdom classification] regarding the evolutionary history of life."

But the three-domain concept did not resolve the issues with the relationship between archaea and eukaryotes. As Ford Doolittle, then at the Dalhousie University, put it in 2020: "[The] three-domain tree wrongly represents evolutionary relationships, presenting a misleading view about how eukaryotes evolved from prokaryotes. The three-domain tree does recognize a specific archaeal–eukaryotic affinity, but it would have the latter arising independently, not from within, the former."

Concept 
The two-domain systems relies mainly on two key concepts that define eukaryotes as members of the domain Archaea and not as a separate domain: eukaryotes originated within Archaea, and Asgards represent the origin of eukaryotes.

Eukaryotes evolved from archaea 
The three-domain system presumes that eukaryotes are more closely related to archaea than to bacteria and are sister group to archaea, thus, it treats them as separate domain. As more new archaea were discovered in the early 2000s, this distinction became doubtful as eukaryotes became deeper linked to archaea. The origin of eukaryotes from archaea, meaning the two are of the same group, came to be supported by studies based on ribosome protein sequencing and phylogenetic analyses in 2004. Phylogenomic analysis of about 6000 gene sets from 185 bacterial, archaeal and eukaryotic genomes in 2007 also suggested origin of eukaryotes from Euryarchaeota (specifically the Thermoplasmatales).

In 2008, researchers from Natural History Museum, London and Newcastle University reported a comprehensive analysis of 53 genes from archaea, bacteria and eukaryotes that included essential components of the nucleic acid replication, transcription, and translation machineries. The conclusion was that eukaryotes evolved from archaea, specifically Crenarchaeota (eocytes) and the results "favor a topology that supports the eocyte hypothesis rather than archaebacterial monophyly and the 3-domains tree of life." A study around the same time also found several genes that are common to eukaryotes and archaea within the Crenarchaeota. These accumulating evidences support the two-domain system.

One of the distinctions of the domain Eukarya in the three-domain system is that eukaryotes have unique proteins such as actin (cytoskeletal microfilament involved in cell motility), tubulin (component of the large cytoskeleton, microtubule) and the ubiquitin system (protein degradation and recycling) that are not found in prokaryotes. However, these so-called "eukaryotic signature proteins" are present in TACK (comprising the phyla Thaumarchaeota, Aigarchaeota, Crenarchaeota and Korarchaeota) archaea but not in other archaea as indicated by genes that codes for such proteins. The first eukaryotic protein identified was actin and actin-related proteins (Arp) 2 and 3 in Crenarchaeota. The implication is that that it explains the possible process of phagocytosis by which an ancient archaeal host eats other cells like bacteria to give rise to the first eukaryote by symbiogenesis.

Tubulin-like proteins named artubulins are found in the genomes of several ammonium-oxidising Thaumarchaeota. A protein called endosomal sorting complexes required for transport (ESCRT III) that is involved in eukaryotic cell division were found in all TACK groups. The ESCRT-III-like proteins constitute the primary cell division system in these archaea. Genes of the ubiquitin system are known from multiple genomes of Aigarchaeota. Ubiquitin-related protein called Urm1 is also present in Crenarchaeota. DNA replication system (GINS proteins) in Crenarchaeota and Halobacteria are similar to the CMG (CDC45, MCM, GINS) complex of eukaryotes. The presence of these eukaryotic proteins in archaea indicates their direct relationship and that eukaryotes emerged from archaea.

Asgards are the last eukaryotic common ancestor 
The discovery of Asgard, described as "eukaryote-like archaea", in 2012 and the following phylogenetic analyses have strengthened the two-domain view of life. These archaea called Lokiarchaeota contain more eukaryotic protein-genes than the TACK group. Initial genetic analysis and later reanalysis showed that out of over 31 selected eukaryotic genes in the archaea, 75% of them directly support eukaryote-archaea grouping, meaning a single domain of Archaea; although the findings did not completely rule out the three-domain system.

As more Asgard groups were subsequently discovered including Thorarchaeota, Odinarchaeota and Heimdallarchaeota, their relationships with eukaryotes became better established. Phylogenetic analyses using ribosomal RNA genes indicated that eukaryotes stemmed from Asgards, and that Heimdallarchaeota are the closest relatives of eukaryotes. Eukaryotic origin from Heimdallarchaeota is also supported by phylogenomic study in 2020. A new group of Asgard found in 2021 (provisionally named Wukongarchaeota) also indicated a deep root for eukaryotic origin. A report in 2022 of another Asgard, named Njordarchaeota, indicates that Heimdallarchaeota-Wukongarchaeota branch is possibly the origin group for eukaryotes.

The Asgards contain at least 80 genes for eukaryotic signature proteins. In addition to actin, tubulin, ubiquitin and ESCRT proteins found in TACK archaea, Asgards contain functional genes for several other eukaryotic proteins such as profilins, ubiquitin system (E1-like, E2-like and small-RING finger (srfp) proteins), membrane-trafficking systems (such as Sec23/24 and TRAPP domains), variety of small GTPases (including Gtr/Rag family GTPase orthologues), and gelsolins. Although these information do not completely resolve the three-domain and two-domain controversies, they are generally considered favouring the two-domain system.

Classification 
The two-domain system defines classification of all known cellular life forms into two domains: Bacteria and Archaea. It overrides the domain Eukaryota recognised in the three-domain classification as one of the main domains. In contrast to the eocyte hypothesis, which proposed two major groups of life (similar to domains) and posited that archaea could be divided to both bacterial and eukaryotic groups, it merged archaea and eukaryotes into a single domain, bacteria entirely in a separate domain.

Domain Bacteria 
It consists entirely of all bacteria. All bacteria are prokaryotes (lacking nucleus), thus, the domain is made up of prokaryotic organisms. Some examples are:

 Cyanobacteria – photosynthesising bacteria that are related to the plastids of eukaryotes.
 Spirochaetota – Gram-negative bacteria that are involved in human diseases like syphilis and lyme disease.
 Actinomycetota – Gram-positive bacteria including Streptomyces species from which several antibiotics were discovered including streptomycin, neomycin, bottromycins and chloramphenicol.

Domain Archaea 
It comprises both prokaryotic and eukaryotic organisms.

Archaea

Archaea are prokaryotic organisms and some examples are:

 All methanogens – which produce the gas methane.
 Most halophiles – which live in very salty water.
 Most thermoacidophiles – which live in acidic high-temperature water.

Eukarya

Eukaryotes are those having nucleus in their cells, and are classified into four groups:

 Protists – an informal taxon for unicellular eukaryotes that include malarial parasites, amoeba, and diatoms.
 Kingdom Fungi – multicellular eukaryotes such as mushroom, yeast, and mould.
 Kingdom Plantae – all plants.
 Kingdom Animalia – all animals.

References 

Biological classification
High-level systems of taxonomy
Domains (biology)